The Zlambach Formation is a geologic formation in Austria. It preserves fossils dating back to the Triassic period.

See also

 List of fossiliferous stratigraphic units in Austria

References
 

Geologic formations of Austria
Triassic System of Europe
Triassic Austria